The 1720 Chinese expedition to Tibet or the Chinese conquest of Tibet in 1720 was a military expedition sent by the Qing dynasty to expel the invading forces of the Dzungar Khanate from Tibet and establish Qing rule over the region, which lasted until the empire's fall in 1912.

History
The Khoshut prince Güshi Khan overthrew the prince of Tsang and established the Khoshut Khanate on the Tibetan Plateau in 1642. As the main benefactor of the Gelug school of Tibetan Buddhism, he made the 5th Dalai Lama the highest spiritual and political authority in Tibet, who established the regime known as Ganden Phodrang in the same year. The Dzungar Khanate under Tsewang Rabtan invaded Tibet in 1717, deposed Ngawang Yeshey Gyatso, the pretender to the position of Dalai Lama of Lha-bzang Khan, who was the last ruler of the Khoshut Khanate, and killed Lhazang Khan and his entire family. They also destroyed a small force at the Battle of the Salween River, which the Kangxi Emperor of the Qing empire had sent to clear traditional trade routes in 1718. In response, an expedition sent by the Kangxi Emperor, together with Tibetan forces under Polhanas of Tsang and Kangchennas (also spelled Gangchenney), the governor of Western Tibet, expelled the Dzungars from Tibet in 1720 as patrons of the Khoshut and liberators of Tibet from the Dzungars. The Qing installed a new, more popular Dalai Lama, Kelzang Gyatso, as the 7th Dalai Lama and left behind a garrison of 3,000 men in Lhasa. In time, the Qing came to see themselves as overlords of Tibet and Tibet was turned into a protectorate by the Manchus. The Qing removed the indigenous civil government that had existed in Lhasa since the rule of the 5th Dalai Lama, and created a Tibetan cabinet or council of ministers known as the Kashag in 1721. This council was to govern Tibet under the close supervision of the Chinese garrison commander stationed in Lhasa, who frequently interfered with Kashag decisions, especially when Chinese interests were involved. Khangchenné would be the first ruling prince to lead the Kashag under Qing overlordship. This began the period of Qing administrative rule of Tibet, which lasted until the fall of the Qing empire in 1912.

At multiple places such as Lhasa, Batang, Dartsendo, Lhari, Chamdo, and Litang, Green Standard troops were garrisoned throughout the Dzungar war. Green Standard Army troops and Manchu Bannermen were both part of the Qing force who fought in Tibet in the war against the Dzungars. It was said that the Sichuan commander Yue Zhongqi (a descendant of Yue Fei) entered Lhasa first when the 2,000 Green Standard soldiers and 1,000 Manchu soldiers of the "Sichuan route" seized Lhasa. According to Mark C. Elliott, after 1728 the Qing used Green Standard Army troops to man the garrison in Lhasa rather than Bannermen. According to Evelyn S. Rawski both Green Standard Army and Bannermen made up the Qing garrison in Tibet. According to Sabine Dabringhaus, Green Standard Chinese soldiers numbering more than 1,300 were stationed by the Qing in Tibet to support the 3,000 strong Tibetan army.

See also
Tibet under Qing rule
Qing empire in Inner Asia
Dzungar–Qing War
Mongol conquest of Tibet
Battle of the Salween River
Chinese expedition to Tibet (1910)
British expedition to Tibet

References

Conflicts in 1720
Wars involving the Qing dynasty
Wars involving the Mongol Empire
Wars involving Tibet
Dzungar Khanate
1720 in China
Invasions of Tibet
China–Tibet relations
Green Standard Army